The 1977 William & Mary Indians football team represented the College of William & Mary as an independent during the 1977 NCAA Division I football season. Led by Jim Root in his sixth year as head coach, William & Mary finished the season with a record of 6–5.

Schedule

Game summaries

East Carolina / "12th Man Tackle"
On November 12, William & Mary met heavily favored East Carolina in the Oyster Bowl. In the third quarter East Carolina led by three points. With 3:15 left in the third quarter, William & Mary quarterback Tom Rozantz broke loose and ran for the end zone. Jim Johnson, a former head coach for the East Carolina football team, who was described by The Virginian Pilot as "a portly 65-year-old gentleman in a raincoat", ran from the sidelines and threw a block tackle on Rozantz before he could score the winning touchdown. The unusual turn of events silenced the screaming William & Mary fans, and the officials gathered to discuss their course of action. After deliberation, the play was ruled a touchdown and William & Mary went on to win, 21–17.

References

William and Mary
William & Mary Tribe football seasons
William and Mary Indians football